Claudia Pasini (2 March 1939 – 23 September 2015) was an Italian fencer. She won a bronze medal in the women's team foil event at the 1960 Summer Olympics.

References

External links
 
 
 

1939 births
2015 deaths
Sportspeople from Trieste
Italian female foil fencers
Olympic fencers of Italy
Fencers at the 1960 Summer Olympics
Olympic bronze medalists for Italy
Olympic medalists in fencing
Medalists at the 1960 Summer Olympics